Caladenia granitora, commonly known as the granite spider orchid, is a species of orchid endemic to the south-west of Western Australia. It has a single, hairy leaf and one or two yellowish-cream, white and red flowers which have a white labellum with a red tip.

Description
The flowers are yellowish-cream, white and red while the lateral sepals have thin, club-like, yellowish-brown glandular tips. The lateral sepals and petals spread widely or curve gently downwards. Flowering occurs from October to November.

Taxonomy and naming
Caladenia granitora was first described in 2001 by Stephen Hopper and Andrew Phillip Brown from a specimen collected near Mount Manypeaks and the description was published in Nuytsia. The specific epithet (granitora) is derived from the Latin words graniticus meaning "of granite" and ora meaning "the coast", referring to the habitat preference of this species.

Distribution and habitat
The granite spider orchid occurs between Mount Manypeaks and Cheyne Beach in the Waychinicup National Park where it grows in heath on coastal granite ourcrops.

Conservation
Surveys of Caladenia granitora recorded a total of 63 individuals in four populations. In 2014, the species was classified as "Threatened Flora (Declared Rare Flora — Extant)" by the Western Australian Government Department of Parks and Wildlife. The main threats to the species are recreational activities, road maintenance, altered fire regimes and small population size.

References

granitora
Orchids of Western Australia
Endemic orchids of Australia
Plants described in 2001
Endemic flora of Western Australia
Taxa named by Stephen Hopper
Taxa named by Andrew Phillip Brown